Benjamin Altman (July 12, 1840 – October 7, 1913) was a New York City department store owner and art collector who is best known today for his large art collection, which he donated to the Metropolitan Museum of Art.

Life and career 
Benjamin Altman was born on July 12, 1840, the son of Bavarian Jews who emigrated to America in 1835 and opened a small store on Attorney Street in New York City. After working in his father's dry goods store, Altman set out on his own. In 1865, Altman founded B. Altman and Company, a dry goods store located on Third Avenue and 10th Street in New York City. Over the years, the store grew in prosperity and expanded to several other locations. In 1877, a large storefront opened on Sixth Avenue; dubbed the "Palace of Trade" for its lavish architecture, Altman's store was one of the first to display clothing for different ages in different areas. In 1906, the B. Altman and Company Building opened on Fifth Avenue.

Altman used his wealth to fund various initiatives in his native city. Shortly before his death on October 7, 1913, he founded the Altman Foundation, a charity to support educational institutions in New York City.

Art collections and portraits 
Benjamin Altman was an avid collector of Rembrandt paintings and Oriental porcelain, much of which he acquired through his friend, art dealer Henry J. Duveen. He was often advised in his painting purchases by Max Friedlander. Upon his death, he donated the collection to the Metropolitan Museum of Art. The painting collection alone was notable for including the museum's first Vermeer and 20 Rembrandts, though a few have since been devoted and reattributed. The collection also contains notable portraits of Flemish and German merchants from the Renaissance.

Paintings in the bequest of Benjamin Altman, 1913 

There is a portrait of Altman in the New York State Museum in Albany; it was painted by the Swiss-born American artist Adolfo Müller-Ury (1862–1947) and donated to the New York Chamber of Commerce by Altman's business partner Michael Friedsam. Müller-Ury knew Altman personally as a client of art dealer Henry Duveen. He was compelled to paint from a photograph after Altman's death. He first completed a 50 x 40 (inch) portrait of Altman seated in his gallery with a Rembrandt behind him and a Chinese vase on a table beside him, but the Metropolitan Museum of Art, for whom this had been painted, chose another portrait of Altman by Ellen Emmet Rand also made from a photograph, and Müller-Ury's larger work went to the Foundation offices; it has since disappeared.

References

External links 

  Altman Foundation
 
 The Records of B. Altman & Co.1876-1955 at the New York Historical Society

1840 births
1913 deaths
American people of German-Jewish descent
Businesspeople from New York City
19th-century American businesspeople
People associated with the Metropolitan Museum of Art
American art collectors